Lake City School, now known as the Lake City Community Center, is a historic school building located at Spring Creek Township, Elk County, Pennsylvania.  It was built in 1889, and is a two-story, rectangular frame vernacular building measuring 22 feet, 6 inches, by 42 feet, 6 inches.  It sits on a sandstone foundation and has a gable roof topped by a belfry rebuilt in 2004.

It was added to the National Register of Historic Places in 2008.

References

Defunct schools in Pennsylvania
School buildings on the National Register of Historic Places in Pennsylvania
School buildings completed in 1889
Buildings and structures in Elk County, Pennsylvania
1889 establishments in Pennsylvania
National Register of Historic Places in Elk County, Pennsylvania